Red Deer Regional Hospital Centre is a district general hospital is located in Red Deer, Alberta.  Alberta Health Services is responsible for the operations of the hospital.

Services
Cardiac rehab
Diabetes clinic
Diagnostic imaging (CT, MRI and Ultrasound)
Emergency
General Surgery
Intensive Care
Mental health
Pediatric mental health
Obstetrics
Medical Oncology
Orthopedic surgery
Otolaryngology - Head & Neck Surgery
Palliative care
Pediatrics
Plastic surgery
Radiation Oncology
Respiratory Therapy
Urology

The hospital is a Level 3 trauma center which allows for care of most severe trauma patients but have transfer protocols if the trauma is above their level of care they can provide. They will stabilize these patients and then take the patient to a level 1 trauma center in Edmonton or Calgary by STARS.

Transport
The hospital is located within a 1-hour service radius of the STARS air ambulance service from both the Calgary and Edmonton base sites.

Education
The hospital serves as a training centre for multiple professions.  The University of Alberta trains residents in their Rural Alberta North family medicine program and rotate medical students on elective. It is also a site for pharmacy resident training and nursing student training from the Red Deer College.

Funding
Philanthropic funding is directed by the Red Deer Regional Health Foundation.

History

Red Deer Memorial Hospital
The Red Deer Memorial Hospital was constructed in 1904 as a memorial to three local men who had participated in the Boer War.  Financial assistance was provided to purchase property at Red Deer Regional Hospital's current location.  At the time it was the only hospital between Calgary and Edmonton.  The original hospital was torn down for an auxiliary hospital in 1961.

Name changes
Red Deer Memorial
Red Deer Municipal
Red Deer General
Red Deer Regional Hospital Centre

References 

Hospital buildings completed in 1904
Hospitals in Alberta
Buildings and structures in Red Deer, Alberta
Heliports in Canada
Certified airports in Alberta